Hawkeye Creek Bridge is a historic structure located in a rural area northeast of Mediapolis, Iowa, United States. The Des Moines County Board of Supervisors contracted with Clinton Bridge and Iron Works on September 23, 1909, to design and build this bridge. It is an  span that carries traffic of a gravel road over Hawkeye Creek. The structure is a single rigid-connected Pratt through truss that is supported by concrete abutments. It basically remains in an unaltered condition. The bridge was listed on the National Register of Historic Places in 1998.

References

Truss bridges in Iowa
Bridges completed in 1910
Road bridges on the National Register of Historic Places in Iowa
National Register of Historic Places in Des Moines County, Iowa
Bridges in Des Moines County, Iowa
Pratt truss bridges in the United States
Metal bridges in the United States